The following is a list of notable people associated with Louisiana Tech University, in the American city of Ruston, Louisiana.

Academia
George Rollie Adams – president and CEO of The Strong National Museum of Play; acquired National Toy Hall of Fame; established the International Center for the History of Electronic Games, World Video Game Hall of Fame, Brian Sutton-Smith Library and Archives of Play, Woodbury School, and American Journal of Play
Jenna Carpenter – Founding Dean and Professor of Engineering at Campbell University
Harvey Cragon –  engineer and Chair Emeritus at the University of Texas at Austin Cockrell School of Engineering
Charles R. Embry – Professor Emeritus at Texas A&M
Woodie Flowers – Professor of mechanical engineering at M.I.T.; former host of Scientific American Frontiers
Les Guice – President of Louisiana Tech University
J. Barry Mason – former interim president of the University of Alabama; dean of the University of Alabama’s Culverhouse College of Commerce and Business Administration
Randy Moffett – President of the University of Louisiana System; former President of Southeastern Louisiana University
R. Byron Pipes – former president of Rensselaer Polytechnic Institute
Dan Reneau – former President of Louisiana Tech University
Brett Riley – writer and college professor
Linda Gilbert Saucier – mathematician, professor, and textbook author
Dheeraj Sharma – internationally renowned marketing scholar; Associate Editor of Journal of Marketing Channels; Editor of the Academy of Marketing Science Proceedings
Rohit Srivastava – professor in the Department of Biosciences and Bioegineering at IIT Bombay
 David H. Templeton – chemist, former dean of the College of Chemistry at the University of California at Berkeley
 Dorothy Leola Nixon Younse (1903–1969) – English professor  1931–1968 at the University of Louisiana at Monroe when known as Ouachita Junior College and then Northeast Louisiana State College; posthumously recognized in 1980 as professor emeritus

Arts, entertainment, and humanities
Trace Adkins – country music singer; three #1 country music singles; one-time ACM Top New Male Vocalist; one-time CMT Male Video of the Year award
Jann Aldredge-Clanton – Christian minister, author, teacher, and chaplain
Hope Anderson – Miss Louisiana 2011
Leraldo Anzaldua – actor, stunt coordinator, and voice actor
Elise Baughman – voice actress; former Louisiana Tech cheerleader
Brady Boyd – pastor
Kix Brooks – country music singer; host of American Country Countdown; 21 #1 country music singles; two #1 country music singles of the year; one-time CMA Entertainer of the Year; fourteen-time CMA Duo of the Year
Sharon Brown – Miss USA 1961; Miss Louisiana 1961
Bill Doss – co-founder of the Elephant Six Collective; member of several bands including Chocolate U.S.A., The Olivia Tremor Control, The Sunshine Fix, and The Apples in Stereo
Kelly Fearing – artist
John Ferguson – sportscaster
Hardy Fox – co-founder of the band The Residents and president of The Cryptic Corporation
Eddie Gossling – comedian
Joey Greco – host of the television show Cheaters
Faith Jenkins – Miss Louisiana 2000, Miss America 2001 first runner-up, attorney and legal analyst
Merle Kilgore – country music singer
Bobby Lounge – singer-songwriter
Qui Nguyen – playwright
The Residents/Ralph Records - founding members Homer Flynn and Hardy Fox first met at Louisiana Tech. 
Phil Robertson – cast member of A&E's Duck Dynasty; inventor of the Duck Commander duck call
Si Robertson – cast member of A&E's Duck Dynasty
John Simoneaux – singer, guitarist, songwriter
Marc Swayze – comic book artist and writer
Robert Tinney – illustrator
Rose Venkatesan – talk show host in India
Muse Watson – actor
Wayne Watson – Grammy Award-winning singer-songwriter in Contemporary Christian music
John Corey Whaley – author
Jamie Wilson – Miss Louisiana 2006

Business
Nick Akins – President and Chief Executive Officer of American Electric Power
Stephen Babcock – lawyer
Martie Cordaro – President and general manager for the Omaha Storm Chasers
Konstantin Dolgan – Entrepreneur
Cindi Love – Executive Director and Chief Operating Officer of the Metropolitan Community Church
Michael McCallister – Chairman of the Board, President, and Chief Executive Officer of Humana, Inc.
Edward L. Moyers – President and CEO of several railroads including MidSouth Rail, Illinois Central Railroad and Southern Pacific Railroad
Ron Ponder – senior information technology executive in several Fortune 100 companies including FedEx, Sprint Nextel, AT&T, Capgemini, and Anthem
Glen Post – President and Chief Executive Officer of CenturyLink
John Simonton – founder of PAiA Electronics; publisher of Electronic Musician
Will Wright – co-founder of the game development company Maxis; Creator of the Sim City computer game series
Charles Wyly – entrepreneur and businessman, philanthropist, civic leader, major contributor to Republican causes and Dallas art projects
Sam Wyly – founder of University Computing Company, Earth Resources Company, Sterling Software, and Maverick Capital; has acquired and is the largest stockholder in several other companies

Government

Activism
Kim Gandy – former president of the National Organization for Women
Jerome Ringo – Chairman of the National Wildlife Federation

Executive
Sam Caldwell – former mayor of Shreveport
Lee Cooke (Class of 1966) – former mayor of Austin, Texas (1988–1991), city council member (1977–1981); CEO, Greater Austin Chamber of Commerce (1983–1987)
Jimmy Faircloth (Class of 1987) – lawyer in Alexandria-Pineville, Louisiana, former executive counsel to Governor Bobby Jindal
Mary Johnson Harris – Member of the Louisiana Board of Elementary and Secondary Education for District 4
Ron Henson – Treasurer of Louisiana
Keith Hightower – former mayor of Shreveport
Donald Edward Jones – mayor of Bossier City 1984–1989
Ibrahima Khalil Kaba – former Guinean Minister of Foreign Affairs
Todd Lamb – current Lieutenant Governor of Oklahoma
Jim McBride – Wyoming Superintendent of Public Instruction
W. Fox McKeithen – former Secretary of State of Louisiana
Charles E. Roemer, II – former Louisiana commissioner of administration in the first two administrations of Governor Edwin Washington Edwards
Clint Williamson – U.S. Ambassador-at-Large for War Crimes Issues, United Nations envoy, White House policy official

Judiciary
E. Joseph Bleich – former Louisiana Supreme Court justice
Brandon B. Brown – current U.S. Attorney for the Western District of Louisiana
Harvey Locke Carey (pre-Law) – U.S. Attorney for the United States District Court for the Western District of Louisiana, 1950–1952
Jeff Cox – judge of the Louisiana 26th Judicial District court in Bossier and Webster parishes since 2005 
Luther F. Cole – state legislator and judge from Baton Rouge; attended Louisiana Tech 1943–1944 
James L. Dennis – judge of the United States Court of Appeals for the Fifth Circuit
Terry A. Doughty – federal judge
Robert G. James – federal judge
Charles A. Marvin – judge of the Louisiana Circuit Court of Appeal for the Second District; journalism graduate of Louisiana Tech, named Distinguished Alumnus in 1989

Legislative
Rodney Alexander – current United States Representative from Louisiana
Andy Anders (Class of 1979) – current Louisiana State Representative from Concordia Parish
John Baine – former Arkansas State Representative from El Dorado
Gilbert Baker – Arkansas State Senator and candidate for the United States Senate in 2010
Saxby Chambliss – current United States Senator from Georgia; former United States Representative from Georgia
J. Frank Colbert – member of the Louisiana House of Representatives and the mayor of Minden
E. Leslie Conkling – former Illinois state representative
Jean M. Doerge – former member of the Louisiana House of Representatives
R. Harmon Drew, Sr. – former Louisiana State Representative from Webster Parish; former Minden city judge
Harvey Fields – state senator for Union and Morehouse parishes, 1916–1920; member of the Louisiana Public Service Commission, 1927–1936; former law partner and political ally of Huey Pierce Long, Jr.
Gabe Firment – member of the Louisiana House of Representatives
John Sidney Garrett – Late Louisiana State Representative from Claiborne Parish; former Speaker of the Louisiana House of Representatives
Terry W. Gee (Bachelor of Science in Personnel Management) – former Louisiana State Representative from Jefferson and Orleans parishes
Garret Graves – current United States Representative from Louisiana
Mary Johnson Harris – District 4 member of the Louisiana Board of Elementary and Secondary Education
Ken Hollis – Late Louisiana State Senator from Jefferson Parish
Mike Jackson – former President pro tempore of the Texas Senate and acting governor of Texas
Edgar H. Lancaster, Jr. – Tallulah lawyer and member of the Louisiana House of Representatives, 1952–1968
Tim Lemons – civil engineer from Cabot, Arkansas; Republican member of the Arkansas House of Representatives since January 2015
Luke Letlow – late United States Representative from Louisiana
Jay Luneau – attorney and state senator from Alexandria
Jim McCrery – former United States Representative from Louisiana
Newt V. Mills – late United States Representative from Louisiana
Billy Montgomery – former state representative from Bossier Parish
Danny Roy Moore – former state senator from Claiborne and Bienville parishes
Tammy Phelps – member of the Louisiana House of Representatives
James P. Pope – former U.S. Senator from Idaho, mayor of Boise, and director of the Tennessee Valley Authority
Keith M. Pyburn (Class of 1932) – state representative for Caddo Parish 1948–1952; attorney in Shreveport and later Washington, D.C.
Gene Reynolds – District 10 member of the Louisiana House of Representatives from Webster Parish
Harold Ritchie (attended; did not graduate) – state representative from Washington Parish since 2004
Rob Shadoin – current Louisiana state representative from Lincoln and Union parishes
Phil Short – former Louisiana state senator from St. Tammany Parish
Joe Waggonner – late United States Representative from Louisiana
Danny Watson – Arkansas state representative
Ardian Zika – Florida state representative

Military
John J. Batbie, Jr. – Major General in the U.S. Air Force who served as Commander of the United States Air Force Reserve Command
Susan Y. Desjardins – Major General in the U.S. Air Force
John Spencer Hardy – Lieutenant General in the U.S. Air Force, attended Louisiana Tech but graduated from Centenary College of Louisiana
Campbell B. Hodges – Retired United States Army major general. 
Jack Ramsaur II – United States Air Force Major General
David Wade – Lieutenant General in the United States Air Force, former commander of Barksdale Air Force Base, state corrections director and adjutant general
La Vern E. Weber – Lieutenant General and former Director of the Army National Guard and Chief of the National Guard Bureau

Sports

Football
Ryan Allen – current NFL punter for the New England Patriots
Joseph Anderson – former NFL wide receiver for the Chicago Bears
Larry Anderson – retired NFL cornerback and kick returner for the Pittsburgh Steelers; two-time Super Bowl Champion
Myron Baker – retired NFL linebacker for the Chicago Bears and Carolina Panthers
Mike Barber – retired NFL tight end for the Houston Oilers, Los Angeles Rams, and Denver Broncos; founder of Mike Barber Ministries
Adairius Barnes – current NFL cornerback for the Detroit Lions
Houston Bates – current linebacker for the Washington Redskins
Lloyd Baxter – retired NFL center for the Green Bay Packers
Taylor Bennett – current quarterback for the Stockholm Mean Machines
George Benyola – retired NFL kicker for the New York Giants
Chris Boniol – retired NFL kicker for the Dallas Cowboys, Philadelphia Eagles, and Chicago Bears; one-time Super Bowl champion
Jim Boudreaux – retired NFL lineman for the Patriots
Cloyce Box – retired NFL end and halfback; two-time NFL champion; two-time Pro Bowl selection; one-time All-Pro selection
Craig Bradshaw – retired NFL quarterback for the Houston Oilers
Terry Bradshaw – retired NFL quarterback for the Pittsburgh Steelers; inducted into the Pro Football Hall of Fame; one-time NFL MVP; four-time Super Bowl champion; two-time Super Bowl MVP; three-time Pro Bowl selection; four-time All-Pro selection; Bert Bell Award; 1970s All-Decade Team; #1 overall NFL draft selection
Kentrell Brice – current NFL safety for the Green Bay Packers
Matt Broha – former NFL defensive end for the New York Giants
Eddie Brown – former AFL offensive specialist for the Albany/Indiana Firebirds; voted best player in arena football history in 2006
Weldon Brown – current CFL cornerback for the Edmonton Eskimos
Bob Brunet – retired NFL running back for the Washington Redskins
Vernon Butler – first round NFL Draft pick; current NFL defensive tackle for the Carolina Panthers
Colby Cameron – current NFL quarterback for the Carolina Panthers
Roger Carr – retired NFL wide receiver for the Baltimore Colts; one-time Pro Bowl selection
Zac Champion – current CFL quarterback for the Calgary Stampeders; former CFL quarterback for the BC Lions
Jessie Clark – retired NFL running back for the Green Bay Packers, Detroit Lions, Arizona Cardinals, and Minnesota Vikings
Pat Collins – former Louisiana-Monroe head football coach
Ryan Considine – current UFL offensive tackle for the Las Vegas Locomotives
Fred Dean – retired NFL defensive end for the San Diego Chargers and San Francisco 49ers; inducted into the Pro Football Hall of Fame; two-time Super Bowl champion
Mark Dillard – former safety for the New England Patriots
Kenneth Dixon – current NFL running back for the Baltimore Ravens
George Doherty – retired NFL lineman and former head football coach at Northwestern State
Vontarrius Dora – current NFL linebacker for the Denver Broncos
Derrick Douglas – retired NFL running back for the Tampa Bay Buccaneers and Cleveland Browns
Jeff Driskel – current NFL Quarterback for the Cincinnati Bengals 
Matt Dunigan – retired CFL quarterback for the Edmonton Eskimos, BC Lions, Toronto Argonauts, Winnipeg Blue Bombers, Birmingham Barracudas, and Hamilton Tiger-Cats; inducted into Canadian Football Hall of Fame; two-time Grey Cup champion; Tom Pate Memorial Award; Jeff Russel Memorial Trophy; Voted one of CFL's Top 50 players; holds pro football record for most passing yards in one game (713)
Denny Duron – national championship quarterback at Louisiana Tech
Troy Edwards – retired NFL wide receiver for the Pittsburgh Steelers, St. Louis Rams, Jacksonville Jaguars, and Detroit Lions; current AFL wide receiver for the Grand Rapids Rampage; holds the NCAA record for most receiving yards in one game (405 vs. Nebraska)
Justin Ellis – current NFL defensive tackle for the Oakland Raiders
IK Enemkpali – current  NFL defensive end for the New York Jets
Hiram Eugene – current NFL safety for the Oakland Raiders
Doug Evans – retired NFL cornerback and safety for the Green Bay Packers, Carolina Panthers, Seattle Seahawks, and Detroit Lions; one-time Super Bowl champion
Jaylon Ferguson – Louisiana Tech and Conference USA all-time leader in sacks
Bobby Gray – retired NFL safety for the Chicago Bears
Garland Gregory – former AAFC guard/linebacker for the San Francisco 49ers
Roland Harper – retired NFL running back for the Chicago Bears
Carlos Henderson – current wide receiver for the Bulldogs
Tom Hinton – retired CFL guard for the BC Lions; inducted into the Canadian Football Hall of Fame; one-time Grey Cup Champion
Johnathan Holland – current NFL wide receiver for the Oakland Raiders; Winner of ESPN's Pontiac Game Changing Performance for his spectacular catch against Nebraska
Ray Holley – current CFL running back
Sam Hughes – former arena football quarterback
Gene Johnson – former AFL quarterback
 Walter Johnson – former NFL linebacker
James Jordan – former NFL wide receiver for the San Francisco 49ers
Trey Junkin – retired NFL tight end and long snapper for the Buffalo Bills, Washington Redskins, Los Angeles Raiders, Seattle Seahawks, Oakland Raiders, Arizona Cardinals, and New York Giants
Austin Kendall – former Louisiana Tech quarterback
David Lee – retired NFL punter for the Baltimore Colts
Phillip Livas – NCAA record holder for most kickoff and punt returns for touchdowns
Caleb Martin – NFL champion for the Chicago Cardinals
Jason Martin – retired quarterback in NFL Europe and arena football
Luke McCown – current NFL quarterback for the New Orleans Saints; former NFL quarterback for the Jacksonville Jaguars, Cleveland Browns, and Tampa Bay Buccaneers
Pete McCulley – former head coach of the San Francisco 49ers
Kevin McGiven – offensive coordinator at San Jose State, Oregon State, and Utah State
Jordan Mills – current NFL offensive tackle for the Chicago Bears
Ryan Moats – current NFL running back for the Minnesota Vikings; former running back for the Philadelphia Eagles, Arizona Cardinals, and Houston Texans
Dennis Morris – current tight end for the St. Louis Rams; 2009 NCAA Tight End of the Year
Eldonta Osborne – retired NFL linebacker for the Cardinals
Quinton Patton – current wide receiver for Louisiana Tech
Joe Raymond Peace – former Louisiana Tech head football coach
Tim Rattay – current UFL quarterback for the Las Vegas Locomotive; former NFL quarterback for the San Francisco 49ers, Tampa Bay Buccaneers, Tennessee Titans, and Arizona Cardinals
Mike Richardson – retired CFL running back for the Winnipeg Blue Bombers and Ottawa Rough Riders; 1992 CFL Most Outstanding Rookie
Willie Roaf – retired NFL offensive tackle for the New Orleans Saints and Kansas City Chiefs; eleven-time Pro Bowl selection; ten-time All-Pro selection; NFL 1990s All-Decade Team; inducted into New Orleans Saints Hall of Fame; inducted into Arkansas Sports Hall of Fame
Amik Robertson – current NFL cornerback for the Las Vegas Raiders
Johnny Robinson – retired NFL defensive end for the Los Angeles Raiders and Oakland Raiders; one-time Super Bowl champion
Moqut Ruffins – football player
Billy Ryckman – retired NFL wide receiver for the Atlanta Falcons
Glenell Sanders – retired NFL linebacker for the Bears, Rams, Broncos, and Colts
Leo Sanford – retired NFL linebacker for the Chicago Cardinals and Baltimore Colts; two-time Pro Bowl selection
Josh Scobee – retired NFL kicker for the Jacksonville Jaguars
Boston Scott – current NFL running back for the New Orleans Saints
Eric Shaw – retired NFL defensive end for the Cincinnati Bengals
John Simon – former NFL running back for the Tennessee Titans and Washington Redskins
Mickey Slaughter – retired NFL quarterback for the Denver Broncos
Artie Smith – retired NFL defensive end for the Cincinnati Bengals, San Francisco 49ers, and Dallas Cowboys
D'Anthony Smith – current defensive tackle for the Jacksonville Jaguars
J'Mar Smith – current USFL quarterback for the Birmingham Stallions
Joe Smith – current CFL running back for the Winnipeg Blue Bombers; former NFL running back for the Jacksonville Jaguars, Tampa Bay Buccaneers, and Tennessee Titans; former NFL Europe running back for the Rhein Fire; former CFL running back for the BC Lions; Eddie James Memorial Trophy; one-time CFL All-Star selection
L'Jarius Sneed – current NFL cornerback for the Kansas City Chiefs
Tommy Spinks – retired NFL wide receiver for the Minnesota Vikings
Quincy Stewart – former NFL player for the San Francisco 49ers and New York Jets; CFL Grey Cup Champion
Matt Stover – current NFL kicker for the Baltimore Ravens; former NFL kicker for the Cleveland Browns; one-time All-Conference selection; one-time Super Bowl champion; one-time Pro Bowl selection; one-time Pro Bowl alternate
Trent Taylor – current wide receiver for the Bulldogs
Pat Tilley – retired NFL wide receiver for the St. Louis Cardinals; one-time Pro Bowl selection
Paul Turner – current NFL wide receiver for the Philadelphia Eagles
Josh Victorian – current NFL cornerback for the Pittsburgh Steelers
John Henry White – retired CFL running back for the BC Lions; one-time Grey Cup Champion
Myles White – current NFL wide receiver for the Green Bay Packers
A.L. Williams – former Louisiana Tech head football coach
Grant Williams – retired NFL offensive tackle for the Seattle Seahawks, New England Patriots, and St. Louis Rams; one-time Super Bowl champion
Milton Williams – current NFL defensive tackle for the Philadelphia Eagles
Tramon Williams – current NFL cornerback for the Green Bay Packers
J. R. Williamson – former NFL linebacker for the Oakland Raiders and Boston Patriots
Jerron Wishom – former NFL cornerback for the Green Bay Packers
Xavier Woods – current NFL safety for the Dallas Cowboys
Andre Young – former NFL defensive back for the San Diego Chargers
Zack T. Young – former Louisiana Tech quarterback and coach

Bulldog basketball
Raheem Appleby – professional basketball player in Europe
Olu Ashaolu – professional basketball player in Spain, France, and Japan
Leon Barmore – retired head coach for the Lady Techsters; best coaching winning percentage in women's basketball history; member of Basketball Hall of Fame; member of the Women's Basketball Hall of Fame; one-time national champion
Jacobi Boykins – professional basketball player in Europe
P.J. Brown – former NBA power forward for the New Jersey Nets, Miami Heat, Charlotte/New Orleans Hornets, Chicago Bulls, and Boston Celtics; one-time NBA champion; three-time NBA All-Defensive Second Team; one-time NBA Sportsmanship Award; one-time J. Walter Kennedy Citizenship Award; inducted into the Louisiana Basketball Hall of Fame
Anthony Duruji – professional basketball player in NBA G League
Tommy Joe Eagles – retired head basketball coach at Louisiana Tech, Auburn, and New Orleans
Marcus Elliott – professional basketball player in Europe
Ron Ellis – drafted by Phoenix Suns; played in CBA
Lavelle Felton – former European professional basketball player
Tim Floyd – NCAA head basketball coach at UTEP; former NBA head basketball coach of the Chicago Bulls and New Orleans Hornets; former NCAA head basketball coach at Iowa State, Idaho, USC, and New Orleans
Trevor Gaskins – professional basketball player
Kyle Gibson – professional basketball player
Stojan Gjuroski – member of the Macedonian national basketball team
Mike Green – retired NBA center for the Seattle SuperSonics, San Antonio Spurs, and Kansas City Kings; retired ABA center for the Denver Nuggets, Denver Rockets, and Virginia Squires; one-time ABA All-Star selection
Alex Hamilton – 2016 Conference USA Player of the Year; player for Hapoel Eilat in the Israeli Basketball Premier League
Jalen Harris – professional basketball player
Gerrod Henderson – former European basketball shooting guard for Panionios, Hemofarm, Crvena zvezda, Anwil Włocławek, and Azovmash Mariupol
Mohammed Ibrahim – basketball player for the Lebanese national team
Jaron Johnson – professional basketball player in the Washington Wizards organization
Kyle Keller – head basketball coach at Stephen F. Austin
Victor King – retired professional basketball player
Michale Kyser (born 1991) - basketball player for Hapoel Holon in the Israeli Basketball Premier League
Dwayne Lathan – played in the NBA D-League
Kenneth Lofton Jr. – NBA power forward for the Memphis Grizzlies
Karl Malone – retired NBA power forward for the Utah Jazz and Los Angeles Lakers; two-time NBA MVP; Thirteen-time NBA All-Star; Eleven-time All-NBA First Team; two-time All-NBA Second Team; one-time All-NBA Third Team; three-time NBA All-Defensive First Team; one-time NBA All-Defensive Second Team; NBA All-Rookie Team; two-time NBA All-Star Game MVP; NBA's 50th Anniversary All-Time Team; two-time Olympic gold medalist; second leading scorer in NBA history
Mike McConathy – current head coach at Northwestern State
Erik McCree – current professional basketball player
Kenyon McNeail – professional basketball player in Europe and Australia
Antonio Meeking – played in the NBA D-League and professionally overseas
Paul Millsap – current NBA power forward for the Brooklyn Nets; NBA All-Rookie Second Team; three-time NCAA rebounding champion
Jackie Moreland – retired NBA player for the Detroit Pistons and New Orleans Buccaneers; inducted into the Louisiana Basketball Hall of Fame
Rich Peek – retired NBA and ABA basketball player
Scotty Robertson – former NBA head coach for the New Orleans Jazz, Chicago Bulls, and Detroit Pistons; Louisiana Tech Bulldogs basketball coach, 1964–1974
Magnum Rolle – NBA center for the Indiana Pacers
Dave Simmons – head coach at McNeese State
Speedy Smith (born 1993) - basketball player for Hapoel Jerusalem of the Israeli Basketball Premier League, 2015 Conference USA Player of the Year
Randy White – retired NBA power forward for the Dallas Mavericks
Jim Wooldridge – NCAA basketball head coach at UC Riverside; former head coach at Central Missouri State, Texas State, Louisiana Tech, and Kansas State

Lady Techster basketball
Janice Lawrence Braxton – retired WNBA player for the Cleveland Rockers; inducted into Women's Basketball Hall of Fame; one-time Olympic gold medalist; Wade Trophy winner
Alisa Burras – retired WNBA center for the Cleveland Rockers, Portland Fire, and Seattle Storm
Mickie DeMoss – former NCAA head women's basketball coach at Kentucky and Florida; one-time SEC Coach of the Year
Shanavia Dowdell – drafted in 2010 WNBA Draft
Cheryl Ford – current WNBA power forward for the Detroit Shock; three-time WNBA champion; WNBA Rookie of the Year; one-time WNBA All-Star game MVP; one-time Olympic bronze medalist
Sonja Hogg – former Louisiana Tech physical education professor, Lady Techsters basketball coach, and Baylor Lady Bears basketball coach; inducted into Women's Basketball Hall of Fame
Tamicha Jackson – All-American; 7-year career in the WNBA
Vickie Johnson – retired WNBA shooting guard for the New York Liberty and San Antonio Silver Stars; two-time WNBA All-Star; Eighth leading scorer in WNBA history
Janet Karvonen – inducted into National High School Sports Hall of Fame, Minnesota High School Sports Hall of Fame, and Minnesota Coaches Hall of Fame
Pam Kelly – Wade Trophy winner; three-time All-American
Venus Lacy – retired WNBA center for the New York Liberty; one-time USA Basketball Female Athlete of the Year; one-time Olympic gold medalist
Angela Lawson – head women's basketball coach at the University of the Incarnate Word
Betty Lennox – current WNBA guard for the Atlanta Dream; former WNBA guard for the Minnesota Lynx, Miami Sol, Cleveland Rockers, and Seattle Storm; WNBA Rookie of the Year; one-time WNBA champion; one-time WNBA Finals MVP
Monica Maxwell – retired WNBA small forward for the Washington Mystics and Indiana Fever
Kim Mulkey (class of 1984) – Current head women's basketball coach at LSU and Former head women's basketball coach at Baylor; one-time Frances Pomeroy Naismith Award; one-time Olympic gold medalist; inducted into women's basketball Hall of Fame; only female to win NCAA title as a player (Louisiana Tech) and a coach (Baylor)
Christie Sides – current head coach of WNBA's Indiana Fever
LaQuan Stallworth – former professional basketball player
Brooke Stoehr – co-head coach of Northwestern State women's basketball
Ayana Walker – retired WNBA forward for the Detroit Shock and Charlotte Sting; one-time WNBA champion
Teresa Weatherspoon – current head coach for the Lady Techsters; retired WNBA point guard for the New York Liberty and Los Angeles Sparks; two-time WNBA Defensive Player of the Year; WNBA second all-time assists leader; four-time WNBA All-Star starter; one-time Olympic gold medalist; one-time Olympic bronze medalist; Wade Trophy winner
Jennifer White – head women's basketball coach at St. Edward's University
Debra Williams – retired WNBA player for the Charlotte Sting

Baseball
Jeff Albert – MLB hitting coach for the Astros, Cardinals, and Mets
Bill Bagwell – MLB left fielder for the Braves and Athletics
Harley Boss – MLB first baseman for the Washington Senators and Cleveland Indians; former head baseball coach at Vanderbilt (deceased)
Jim Case –  Current head baseball coach at Jacksonville State
Phil Diehl – MLB pitcher for the Rockies
Atley Donald – MLB pitcher for the New York Yankees; one-time World Series champion; two-time American League champion (deceased)
Mark Doubleday – Olympic baseball player
Chuck Finley – retired MLB pitcher for the California/Anaheim Angles, Cleveland Indians, and St. Louis Cardinals; five-time All-Star
Tom Herrin – MLB pitcher for the Boston Red Sox (deceased)
Phil Hiatt – retired MLB utility player for the Kansas City Royals, Detroit Tigers, and Los Angeles Dodgers
Rick Huckabay – former men's basketball head coach for Marshall University
Mike Jeffcoat – retired MLB pitcher for the Cleveland Indians, San Francisco Giants, Texas Rangers, and Florida Marlins
Bob Linton – former MLB catcher for the Pittsburgh Pirates
Phil Maton – current MLB pitcher for the Houston Astros
Kevin McGehee – former MLB pitcher for the Baltimore Orioles
Randy McGilberry – retired MLB pitcher for the Kansas City Royals
Charlie Montoyo – current manager for the Toronto Blue Jays; former MLB player for the Montreal Expos
Brian Myrow – current Minor League first baseman in the San Diego Padres organization; former MLB first baseman for the Los Angeles Dodgers
Rebel Oakes – MLB center fielder for the Cincinnati Reds, St. Louis Cardinals, and Pittsburgh Rebels (deceased)
Pat Patterson – winningest college baseball coach in Louisiana sports history; Seven-time conference Coach of the Year (deceased)
Jeff Richardson – retired MLB infielder for the Cincinnati Reds, Pittsburgh Pirates, and Boston Red Sox
David Segui – retired MLB first baseman for the Baltimore Orioles, New York Mets, Montreal Expos, Seattle Mariners, Toronto Blue Jays, Texas Rangers, and Cleveland Indians
Dave Short – retired MLB outfielder for the Chicago White Sox
George Stone – retired MLB pitcher for the New York Mets and Atlanta Braves

Track and field
Ayanna Alexander – Olympian triple jumper
Chelsea Hayes – Olympian long jumper
Olivia McKoy – Olympian javelin thrower
Jason Morgan – Olympian discus thrower

Soccer
Nomvula Kgoale – South African national team soccer player
Donya Salomon-Ali – Haitian national team soccer player

Horse racing
J. Keith Desormeaux – horse trainer of 2016 Preakness Stakes winner Exaggerator

Notable Louisiana Tech faculty
Elenora A. Cawthon – former dean
Tabbetha Dobbins – physicist and an associate professor of Physics & Astronomy
Patricia A. Edwards – professor, author, and member of the Reading Hall of Fame
Lee Hedges – football coach
Rodney L. Lowman – psychologist
Yuri Lvov – research scientist and professor of chemistry; 2007 Small Times National Innovator of the Year
E. Wilson Lyon – former president of Pomona College
Margaret Maxfield – mathematician and mathematics book author
Garnie W. McGinty – historian, 1930s–1960s
Virgil Orr – chemical engineering professor, Tech dean, and then vice president (1952–1980); state representative, 1988–1992
Vir Phoha – professor of electrical engineering and computer science
Ellis Sandoz – Director of the Eric Voegelin Institute for American Renaissance Studies
John D. Winters – historian (1948–1984)

References

Louisiana Tech University people